Pepper Peak is a sharp peak in Antarctica, 940 m, standing 2 nautical miles (3.7 km) north of Mount Nervo in the Schmidt Hills portion of the Neptune Range, Pensacola Mountains. It was mapped by the United States Geological Survey (USGS) from surveys and U.S. Navy air photos from 1956 to 1966. It was named by the Advisory Committee on Antarctic Names (US-ACAN) for Clifford G. Pepper, a hospital corpsman at Ellsworth Station during the winter of 1958.

Mountains of Queen Elizabeth Land
Pensacola Mountains